Assumption College may refer to these educational institutions:

Australia
 Assumption College, Kilmore, Victoria
 Assumption College, Warwick, Queensland

Canada
 Assumption University (Windsor, Ontario) (formerly Assumption College)
 Assumption College (Brantford), Brantford, Ontario

India
 Assumption College, Changanasserry

Philippines
 Assumption College of Davao
 Assumption College San Lorenzo
 Assumption Antipolo
 Assumption Iloilo

Thailand
 Assumption College (Thailand)
 Assumption College Samutprakarn
 Assumption College Sriracha
 Assumption College Thonburi

United States
 Assumption University (Worcester), Worcester, Massachusetts
 Assumption College for Sisters, Mendham, New Jersey

See also
 Assumption University (disambiguation)